The letter Ʈ (minuscule: ʈ), called T with retroflex hook, is a letter of the Latin alphabet based on the letter t. It is used to represent a voiceless retroflex plosive in the International Phonetic Alphabet, and is used in some alphabets of African languages. A ligature of ʈ with h was part of the Initial Teaching Alphabet to represent the voiceless dental fricative.

Computer encoding
The majuscule and the minuscule are located at U+01AE and U+0288 in Unicode, respectively.

External links
Practical Orthography of African Languages

Latin letters with diacritics
Phonetic transcription symbols